Stibochiona nicea, the popinjay, is a species of nymphalid butterfly found in Asia.

Description

The male upperside is a deep velvety black. Forewing: cell with three somewhat obscure light blue transverse short lines, a curved series of four discal and of five postdiscal minute white spots anteriorly, and a complete series of subterminal similar spots, bordered inwardly by a row of paired blue marks on each side of veins 1 to 6. Hindwing: a postdiscal blue transverse sinuous line not reaching the costa or dorsum, followed by a subterminal series of blue circular marks with black centres, their rims outwardly snow white. Cilia of both forewings and hindwings are white, alternated with black on the forewing, continuous on the hindwing. Underside purplish black. Forewing: the cell-marks better defined, the discal and postdiscal series of spots sinuous, each of seven spots; the subterminal row of spots as on the upperside, but larger, the line of blue paired marks on the veins bordering the subterminal row on the inner side above absent. Hindwing: three obliquely placed subbasal spots and a transverse sinuous line of discal spots blue, followed by a series of five or six postdiscal dots and a subterminal line of transverse inwardly crescentic bars in the interspaces lilacine white. 
Antennae, head, thorax and abdomen black.
Female similar, but on the upperside the ground colour dull black suffused with green, the cell-markings and the inner subterminal paired spots on the forewing and the postdiscal sinuous band on the hindwing metallic green. Underside ground colour fuliginous black, the markings as in the male but larger.

Gallery

See also
Nymphalidae
List of butterflies of India
List of butterflies of India (Nymphalidae)

References

Cyrestinae
Butterflies of Asia